Blue Kimble (born January 3, 1983) is an American actor, model, and former football player.

Life and career
Kimble was born and raised in Atlanta, Georgia. Before acting, he was a football player and played in the Arena Football League and the National Football League with the Buffalo Bills. After his football career, he began appearing on television shows, including The Game, Being Mary Jane and Devious Maids. He has appeared in more than 20 Atlanta-filmed movies, and starred in the TV One original films Media (2017) and The Bobby DeBarge Story (2019).

In 2018, Kimble began starring as Sawyer in the Urban Movie Channel drama series Monogamy. In 2020, he began starring in the BET+ soap opera, Ruthless.

In 2019, Kimble played a lead role opposite Chace Crawford in the American drama thriller film Nighthawks.

Filmography

Film

Television

References

External links

21st-century American male actors
1983 births
American male television actors
Actors from Atlanta
Living people